The year 1902 was marked, in science fiction, by the following events.

Births and deaths

Births 
 April 4 : Stanley G. Weinbaum, American writer (died 1935)
 August 10 : Curt Siodmak, American writer (died 2000)

Deaths

Events

Awards 
The main science-fiction Awards known at the present time did not exist at this time.

Literary releases

Novels

Stories collections

Short stories

Comics

Audiovisual outputs

Movies 
 A Trip to the Moon (in French : Le Voyage dans la Lune), a silent film by Georges Méliès.

See also 
 1902 in science
 1901 in science fiction
 1903 in science fiction

References

science-fiction
Science fiction by year